John Veriker Morrissy (August 13, 1857 – July 31, 1924) was a merchant and political figure in New Brunswick, Canada. He represented Northumberland County in the Legislative Assembly of New Brunswick from 1888 to 1890 and from 1903 to 1916 and Northumberland in the House of Commons of Canada from 1921 to 1924 as a Liberal member.

He was born in Newcastle, Colony of New Brunswick, the son of Patrick Morrissy and Rose Farrell, both Irish immigrants, and entered business as a livery stable operator. In 1879, he married Joanna Agnes Dunn. He served on the council for Northumberland County from 1882 to 1883. Morrissy was elected to the provincial assembly in an 1888 by-election held after William A. Park resigned his seat. He served in the province's Executive Council as Minister of Public Works from 1908 to 1916. Morrissy ran unsuccessfully for a federal seat in 1896, 1900 and 1917. He died in office at the age of 66.

His son Charles Joseph Morrissy also served in the House of Commons. The Morrissy Bridge over the Miramichi River was named after John Morrissy.

Electoral record

References
 
The Canadian parliamentary companion, 1889 JA Gemmill
 Canadian Parliamentary Guide, 1922, EJ Chambers

1857 births
1924 deaths
Liberal Party of Canada MPs
Members of the House of Commons of Canada from New Brunswick
New Brunswick Liberal Association MLAs